William Davey (28 July 1825, Thorpe, Norwich – 26 March 1917, Llandaff) was Dean of Llandaff from 1897 until 1913.

Davey was educated at Charterhouse and Lincoln College, Oxford. He was a Master at Marlborough College before becoming a tutor of Chichester Theological College, then Cuddeson, and finally St David's College, Lampeter. He was a Prebendary of St David's Cathedral from 1876 until 1895; and Examining Chaplain to the Bishop of Llandaff from 1895 to 1905.

References

1825 births
1917 deaths
People from Thorpe Hamlet
People educated at Charterhouse School
Alumni of Lincoln College, Oxford
Deans of Llandaff